The 1923 Chicago White Sox season was a season in Major League Baseball. The White Sox finished seventh in the American League with a record of 69 wins and 85 losses.

Regular season

Season standings

Record vs. opponents

Notable transactions 
 May 12, 1923: Sloppy Thurston was purchased by the White Sox from the St. Louis Browns.
 May 31, 1923: Ernie Johnson was selected off waivers from the White Sox by the New York Yankees.

Roster

Player stats

Batting

Starters by position 
Note: Pos = Position; G = Games played; AB = At bats; H = Hits; Avg. = Batting average; HR = Home runs; RBI = Runs batted in

Other batters 
Note: G = Games played; AB = At bats; H = Hits; Avg. = Batting average; HR = Home runs; RBI = Runs batted in

Pitching

Starting pitchers 
Note: G = Games pitched; IP = Innings pitched; W = Wins; L = Losses; ERA = Earned run average; SO = Strikeouts

Other pitchers 
Note: G = Games pitched; IP = Innings pitched; W = Wins; L = Losses; ERA = Earned run average; SO = Strikeouts

Relief pitchers 
Note: G = Games pitched; W = Wins; L = Losses; SV = Saves; ERA = Earned run average; SO = Strikeouts

Notes

References 
1923 Chicago White Sox at Baseball Reference

Chicago White Sox seasons
Chicago White Sox season
Chicago White